Florencia Martina Habif (born 22 August 1993) is an Argentine field hockey player. Being part of Argentina's Junior National Team "Las Leoncitas" ("The Baby Lionesses") since 2009 and of the National Team Las Leonas ("The Lionesses") since 2010, she competed in several tournaments, including the 2012 Summer Olympics in London, where the team achieved the silver medal, being the team's youngest player. In 2014, she was named the Best Young Player in the world by the International Hockey Federation and has been nomitaded 4 times.

Florencia is also a player in the club Gimnasia y Esgrima de Buenos Aires (GEBA) since she was 4 years old. Habif is part of the so-called New Generation of Argentina's Women's Field Hockey.

Sports career
Florencia started to play field hockey at GEBA and then joined Argentina's Junior National Team at the age of 17, achieving the gold medal at the 2010 Pan American Youth Championship Tournament in Montevideo, Uruguay then qualifying and earning the silver medal at the 2010 Summer Youth Olympics in Singapore.

With the Senior National Team, Florencia earned three Champions Trophy, the World League 2014-15, the bronze medal at the 2014 World Cup and two Pan American Cups.

She played the Visa International Invitational Hockey Tournament at London before her first Olympic Games at the age of 19 at the 2012 Summer Olympics in London.

Sponsorship

Ritual
Florencia is sponsored by Ritual Hockey, joining many other top athletes from around the world.

Nike
Florencia Habif is provided with Nike clothes.

Red Bull 
Habif is also sponsored by Red Bull along with some of the best athletes from Argentina and the world.

Awards
 Player of the Tournament at the 2012 Pan American Junior Championship held at Guadalajara, Mexico.
 Revelación de Oro (Gold Revelation) on 2012, at the Fiesta del Deporte ("Party of the Sports") sponsored by Clarín, one of Argentina's main newspapers, due to her performance with the National Team.
 Nominated to the Terna Olímpica 2012 at the Premios Olimpia, an award organized by the Círculo de Periodistas de Buenos Aires (Circle of Journalists of Buenos Aires).
 2014 - FIH Young Women Player of the Year.

References

External links 
 
 
 

1993 births
Living people
Argentine people of Lebanese descent
Sportspeople of Lebanese descent
Argentine female field hockey players
Olympic field hockey players of Argentina
Field hockey players at the 2012 Summer Olympics
Olympic medalists in field hockey
Las Leonas players
Olympic silver medalists for Argentina
Field hockey players from Buenos Aires
Medalists at the 2012 Summer Olympics
Field hockey players at the 2010 Summer Youth Olympics
Field hockey players at the 2015 Pan American Games
Pan American Games silver medalists for Argentina
Field hockey players at the 2016 Summer Olympics
Pan American Games medalists in field hockey
Expatriate field hockey players
Argentine expatriate sportspeople in Germany
South American Games gold medalists for Argentina
South American Games medalists in field hockey
Female field hockey defenders
Competitors at the 2014 South American Games
Mannheimer HC players
Feldhockey Bundesliga (Women's field hockey) players
Medalists at the 2015 Pan American Games